Sylvester Donovan Ryan (born September 3, 1930) is an American prelate of the Roman Catholic Church. He served as bishop of the Diocese of Monterey in California from 1992 to 2007 and as an auxiliary bishop of the Archdiocese of Los Angeles from 1990 to 1992.

Biography

Early life 
Ryan was born on September 3, 1930, in Avalon, California. On May 3, 1957, Ryan was ordained to the priesthood for the Archdiocese of Los Angeles by Cardinal James McIntyre. An educator, Ryan served as principal of Paraclete High School in Lancaster, California, in the 1960s to June 1971, and Saint Paul High School in Santa Fe Springs, California, in the 1970s.  Ryan was named president-rector of the Archdiocesan Saint John's College Seminary in Camarillo, California, 1986.

Auxiliary Bishop of Los Angeles 
On February 17, 1990, Pope John Paul II appointed Ryan as an auxiliary bishop of the Archdiocese of Los Angeles and titular bishop of Remesiana. Ryan was consecrated at the Cathedral of Saint Vibiana in Los Angeles on May 31, 1990 by then Archbishop Roger Mahony.

Bishop of Monterey 
On January 28, 1992, John Paul II appointed Ryan as the third bishop of Monterey. Ryan was installed as bishop on March 19,1992.Ryan served as the president of the California Catholic Conference from 1997 to 2004.

On December 18, 2006, Pope Benedict XVI accepted Ryan's letter of resignation as bishop of the Diocese of Monterey. He was succeeded by Auxiliary Bishop Richard Garcia.

See also
 

 Catholic Church hierarchy
 Catholic Church in the United States
 Historical list of the Catholic bishops of the United States
 List of Catholic bishops of the United States
 Lists of patriarchs, archbishops, and bishops

References

External links
Roman Catholic Diocese of Monterey Official Site

Episcopal succession

1930 births
Living people
20th-century Roman Catholic bishops in the United States
Roman Catholic Diocese of Monterey in California
People from Avalon, California
Catholics from California
21st-century Roman Catholic bishops in the United States